Lindholm may refer to:

Surname
 Lindholm (surname)

Places
 , a district of Nørresundby, Denmark
 Lindholm (Stege Bugt), an island in Vordingborg Municipality, Denmark
 Lindholm Strait, a strait in the Sea of Okhotsk
 Risum-Lindholm, a district in Nordfriesland, Germany

Other uses
 Lindholm (manor house), a historic estate in Lejre Municipality, Denmark
 Lindholm Høje, major Viking burial site in Denmark
 Lindholm IF, a Danish football club
 Lindholm amulet, bone piece found in Skåne, Sweden
 Lindholm station, a railway station in Nørresundby, Denmark
 R. W. Lindholm Service Station in Cloquet, Minnesota, Listed in the U.S. National Register of Historic Places

See also
 Lindholme (disambiguation)
 Lindholmen (disambiguation)
 Lindholmiola, a genus of land snails